Rochdale Road Halt served the village of Greetland, West Yorkshire, England, on the Stainland Branch from 1907 to 1929.

Location

The halt was located where the Stainland Branch crosses Rochdale Road (B6113) on an overbridge. The bridge and station have now been demolished and little remains to show a railway crossed the road here.

Route

References

 

Disused railway stations in Calderdale
Former Lancashire and Yorkshire Railway stations
Railway stations in Great Britain opened in 1907
Railway stations in Great Britain closed in 1929